The Fatal Encounter (lit. The King's Wrath) is a 2014 South Korean film based on a real-life assassination attempt on King Jeongjo. Jeongjo is portrayed by Hyun Bin, in his first role in a period drama and first acting project after being discharged from mandatory military service.

King Jeongjo (1752-1800) was the 22nd ruler of the Joseon Dynasty, nicknamed the "King of Misfortune." When he was 10 years old, Jeongjo witnessed the death of his father Crown Prince Sado, who was executed by a royal decree ordered by his grandfather, then-King Yeongjo. During his reign, Jeongjo was subsequently caught in the midst of fierce party strife between the Noron and Soron factions, and survived seven assassination attempts just in his first year as king. The film is inspired by Jeongyuyeokbyeon, one such assassination attempt on Jeongjo by his political opponents in 1777, the king's first year as the nation's ruler. The Fatal Encounter depicts the 24 hours leading up to that event in Jeongjo's life and those around him.

This is the feature film debut of director Lee Jae-kyoo; he previously helmed the television series Damo (2003), Fashion 70's (2005), Beethoven Virus (2008), and The King 2 Hearts (2012), as well as the online movie The Influence (2010).

Plot 
In 1777, one year after he began his reign, King Jeongjo lives a perilous palace life amidst opposition and threats from those around him who harbor political ambitions. He prepares himself for possible attacks by working out alone in the palace. Jeongjo is a calm and considerate man, but he is also afraid. The only one he trusts is his loyal court servant Gap-soo, called the king's shadow.

When Gap-soo was young, he was sold to a cruel man named Gwang-baek, who illegally and brutally trains orphaned children to become professional assassins. Gap-soo befriends Eul-soo, another orphan who is a few years younger than him. When Gwang-baek is instructed to give one of his children to become a court eunuch, he asks Gap-soo and Eul-soo to play the game of rock-paper-scissors; Gap-soo purposely loses the game in an effort to protect Eul-soo. Thus, Gap-soo is castrated and sent to the royal palace. There he meets Jeongjo, a young boy who is still mourning his father's death. Meanwhile, Eul-soo continues enduring harsh training and grows up as a merciless killer.

Years later, Eul-soo, now the deadliest member of the secret group of assassins, receives orders to kill Jeongjo within 24 hours. He infiltrates the palace, where he falls in love with Wol-hye, a gungnyeo (or female court servant). Jeongjo's mother Lady Hyegyeong is also locked in dangerous conflict with the late King Yeongjo's much younger widow, dowager Queen Jeongsun. Meanwhile, Gap-soo confesses his dark past to Jeongjo and swears to protect him.

Cast 
 Hyun Bin as King Jeongjo.
 Goo Seung-hyun as young Jeongjo
 Jung Jae-young as Gap-soo/Sang-chaek, an assassin sent to kill the king who goes undercover as a royal eunuch, but who becomes convinced of Jeongjo's fitness to rule.
 Sung Yu-bin as young Sang-chaek
 Jo Jung-suk as Eul-soo/Sal-soo, an assassin hired to kill Jeongjo.
 Chun Bo-geun as young Sal-soo
 Cho Jae-hyun as Gwang-baek, who kidnaps orphaned children and trains them into ruthless assassins.
 Han Ji-min as Queen Jeongsun, the queen dowager, consort of Jeongjo's grandfather King Yeongjo, and Jeongjo's political rival.
 Kim Sung-ryung as Lady Hyegyeong of the Poongsan Hong clan, Jeongjo's mother, who is desperate to save her son.
 Park Sung-woong as Hong Guk-yeong, a politician who strongly supports Jeongjo.
 Go Bo-gyeol as laundry court lady at palace
 Jung Eun-chae as Kang Wol-hye, a female court servant in charge of the king's clothing.
 Lee Jae-hee as young Wol-hye
 Song Young-chang as Gu Seon-bok
 Lee Do-kyeong as Ahn Guk-rae
 Seo Yi-sook as Go Soo-ae
 Kim Min-jae as Choi Se-bok
 Kim Dae-myung as Kang Yong-hwi
 Kim Ju-wan as Hong Sang-beom
 Yoo Eun-mi as Bok-bing
 Lee Jun-hyeok

Release 
The Fatal Encounter was released in South Korea on April 30, 2014. The film also had a limited theatrical run in 25 North American cinemas on May 23.

Box office 
The opening was the biggest for a local release in 2014, though it trailed to debuts of Hollywood tentpoles Captain America: The Winter Soldier and The Amazing Spider-Man 2.

Despite receiving mostly mixed to negative reviews from critics after its press screening, the period blockbuster has sold over 3.2 million tickets two weeks since its release.

It grossed  and sold 3.85 million tickets in South Korea.

Awards and nominations

References

External links 
  
 The Fatal Encounter at CJ Entertainment
 
  
 

Films set in the Joseon dynasty
2014 films
Lotte Entertainment films
Films directed by Lee Jae-kyoo
2010s historical action films
South Korean historical action films
2010s South Korean films